The Corniche is a waterfront promenade corniche in Alexandria, Egypt, running along the Eastern Harbour. It is one of the major corridors for traffic in Alexandria. The Corniche is formally designated "26 of July Road" west of Mansheya and "El Geish Road" east of it; however, these names are rarely used.

Italian-Egyptian architect Pietro Avoscani designed it in 1870.

The western end starts by the Citadel of Qaitbay (built in place of the Lighthouse of Alexandria). It runs for over ten miles and ends at Montaza.

References

Buildings and structures in Alexandria
Alexandria